Margaretia is a frondose organism known from the middle Cambrian Burgess shale and the Kinzers Formation of Pennsylvania.  Its fronds reached about 10 cm in length and are peppered with a range of length-parallel oval holes.  It was originally interpreted as an alcyonarian coral. It was later reclassified as a green alga closely resembling modern Caulerpa by D.F. Satterthwait in her Ph.D. thesis in 1976, a finding supported by Conway Morris and Robison in 1988. More recently, it has been treated as an organic tube, that is used as nest of hemichordate Oesia.

References

External links 
 

Burgess Shale fossils
Wheeler Shale
Incertae sedis